Maryland Route 577 (MD 577) is a state highway in the U.S. state of Maryland.  Known as Reliance Road, the state highway runs  from MD 392 at Reliance north to MD 313 near Federalsburg.  MD 577 follows the Dorchester–Caroline county line for its entire length.  The state highway is considered to be in Caroline County for maintenance purposes.  The first section of MD 577 was paved near its northern terminus by 1910 and reconstructed as a state highway in 1935.  The highway was completed south to Reliance in 1942.

Route description

The state highway heads northwest as a two-lane undivided road along the Caroline–Dorchester county line, passing through farmland. MD 577 reaches its northern terminus at an intersection with MD 313 south of Federalsburg. Reliance Road continues north toward Federalsburg as MD 313, while southbound MD 313 follows Eldorado Road into Dorchester County.

History
That portion was repaved in 1935 as a state highway. The remainder of MD 577 south to Reliance was completed in 1942.

Junction list
MD 577 follows the Caroline–Dorchester county line for its entire length.  The state highway is considered to be in Caroline County for maintenance purposes.

See also

References

External links

MDRoads: MD 577

577
Maryland Route 577
Maryland Route 577